The Hughleys is an American sitcom that aired on ABC from September 22, 1998 to April 28, 2000 and on UPN from September 11, 2000 to May 20, 2002. It starred comedian D. L. Hughley as the main character, Darryl Hughley, and Elise Neal as Yvonne, his hard-working wife, who move their family from the inner city to suburban Los Angeles.

Plot summary
The show starred D. L. Hughley as the main character, vending machine salesman Darryl Hughley. Elise Neal portrayed Darryl's wife Yvonne. Former Living Single co-star John Henton portrayed the couple's best friend Milsap from the "old neighborhood", who often visited the family and helped them out (much resemblance to Willona visiting James and Florida on Good Times). Ashley Monique Clark portrayed Darryl and Yvonne's 12-year-old daughter Sydney, and Dee Jay Daniels portrayed their 10-year-old son Michael; both children sometimes acted out and sometimes caused complete chaos. Michael's best friends included Ronnie (Preston Wamsley), Otto (played by Connor Matheus in Seasons 1 and 2, then Ian Meltzer in Seasons 3 and 4), and Miles (Martin Spanjers).

The show's initial plot involved successful vending-machine business owner Darryl Hughley moving his family from a South Los Angeles ghetto to West Hills, a predominantly white neighborhood in the San Fernando Valley. Darryl and his family try to adjust to living in an all-white area while trying not to forget who they are and where they came from. Darryl and Yvonne befriend their new neighbors, Sally and Dave, who are Darryl's polar opposites. The story has many racial themes that are usually comedic as Darryl makes fun of other races, especially his white and Korean neighbors.

Cast and characters
Marietta DePrima and Eric Allan Kramer played Dave and Sally Rogers, a friendly, wholesome suburban white couple. Marla Gibbs played Darryl's happy-go-lucky mother Hattie Mae opposite Ellis Williams as his father Henry. Telma Hopkins portrayed Yvonne's mother, Paulette Williams, and Sherman Hemsley portrayed Yvonne's father, James Williams, who thought of Darryl as a "jackass". Patricia Belcher appeared as Aunt Jessie Mae Hughley, and Adele Givens portrayed Yvonne's older sister Shari Williams, Darryl's wisecracking, backtalking, evil sister-in-law.

The show spent two seasons on ABC. In its first season, it followed Home Improvement, but was canceled when ABC decided to revamp its TGIF lineup.  UPN picked up the show in the fall of 2000 and it aired in the Monday night lineup along Moesha, The Parkers and Girlfriends.  While The Parkers and Girlfriends had improved ratings, The Hughleys aired its series finale after its fourth season.

The series had many guest stars including Ashley Tisdale, Billy Dee Williams, as Darryl's biological father, Kelly Rowland, Lil' Romeo, Gary Coleman,        Vivica A. Fox, Mo'Nique, Tyra Banks, and Rose Marie.

Main characters
 Darryl Hughley (D. L. Hughley): a thirty-five-year-old successful salesman and business owner. His wife is Yvonne, and they have two children, Sydney and Michael. He moved from his old black neighborhood into a white suburban neighborhood. He is the son of Henry and Hattie Mae Hughley. Upon the show's move from ABC to UPN, the character was featured in a crossover appearance on the UPN series The Parkers in the Season 2 episode "Who's Your Mama?".  He is best friends with Milsap (his sales manager), and later his white neighbour Dave Rogers.
 Yvonne Williams-Hughley (Elise Neal): Darryl's wife, the mother of their two children, and best friend of Sally. She does not get along with Darryl's mother Hattie, who constantly criticizes everything she does. Darryl calls her "Vonnie", as does Milsap sometimes.
 Sydney (Ashley Monique Clark) and Michael Hughley (Dee Jay Daniels): Darryl and Yvonne's 12-year-old daughter and 11-year-old son.
 Dave (Eric Allan Kramer) and Sally Rogers (Marietta DePrima): the Hughley family's Caucasian neighbors and close friends. They often hang out and travel together. Initially, Darryl was unwilling to befriend them out of fear that they were racists. Dave can be described as a "jolly giant". He owns a sporting goods store, and is very knowledgeable about sports, vehicles, and extreme activities. Sally and Darryl have a sort of brother/sister-like friendship, as sometimes he'll turn to her for advice or jokingly tease her. Dave and Sally have two children: son Otto and daughter Gretchen. Sydney and Michael often address Dave and Sally as "Uncle Dave" and "Aunt Sally".
Milsap Morris (John Henton), Darryl's lifelong best friend, the sales manager of his company. He frequently visits the Hughley household, and provides much comic relief throughout the series. Unlike Darryl, Milsap is unmarried with no children which sometimes saddens him. Early in the series, Dave becomes Milsap's second-best friend after the two form a strong friendship - which Darryl was jealous of at first until he learned to be friends with both men. Darryl, Yvonne, and Dave often refer to him by his nickname "Sap", whereas Sydney and Michael address him as "Uncle Sap" or "Uncle Milsap".

Recurring characters
 Hattie Mae Hughley (Marla Gibbs), Darryl's somewhat aggressive mother, who made her first appearance in "The Thanksgiving Episode". She criticizes Yvonne, from her cooking habits to everything else she finds wrong with her. She also appears to have a firm handle on Darryl as the no-nonsense mother who refuses to let him get away with anything, despite his adulthood. This is shown in many episodes, one example being Sydney and Michael failing to "punish" Daryl for drugs from his past, in which they get their grandmother to do it instead. She made her last appearance on "How Hattie Got Her Groove Back".
 Henry Hughley (Ellis Williams), Darryl's "father", who made his first appearance in "The Thanksgiving Episode". In the 2nd-season episode, Darryl discovers that Henry isn't his biological father; but still Darryl sees him as more of a father for raising him. He made his last appearance in "Bored of the Rings".
 Jessie Mae (Patricia Belcher), Darryl's maternal aunt. She made her first appearance in "The Thanksgiving Episode", where the Hughley women attempt to Thanksgiving cooking. In a few other appearances, she is shown more confrontational than Hattie Mae, but still may have her moments.
 Hazel/M'Dear (Virginia Capers), Darryl's maternal grandmother. She makes her first appearance in "The Thanksgiving Episode", where the Hughley women attempt to take over Thanksgiving cooking. She appears to be less insulting than Hattie Mae.
 JoJo (Miguel A. Núñez Jr.), Darryl's older brother, who worked at an airport.
 James Williams (Sherman Hemsley), Yvonne's father who still doesn't approve of Darryl; the two never get along with each other.
 Paulette Williams (Telma Hopkins), Yvonne's mother, who is less confrontational with Darryl.
 Shari Williams (Adele Givens), Yvonne's older sister. Like her father, she doesn't get along with Darryl.

Episodes

Series finale
The Hughleys ended with a two-part series finale entitled "It's a Girl!" (aired on May 13 and May 20, 2002). In this episode, Darryl Hughley's niece, Carly (guest star Kelly Rowland) is preparing for college (the college was unknown), with peace, tranquility and no expectation of her relatives coming to annoy her (implying the entire Hughleys clan). Carly then receives an unexpected visit from her cousins Sydney and Michael. Darryl and Milsap go to their twentieth high school reunion and Milsap learns that his "old" girlfriend, Shandra, has a child, and he is the father.

Ratings

Syndication
Reruns of The Hughleys started airing in syndication in mid-September 2002 to 2003, such as WWOR-TV who reran the show at 6:30pm weeknights, replacing reruns of Sister, Sister from 2002–03. The series aired on FXX from 2013–2014 in a widescreen form.
Since January 5, 2015, Bounce TV began airing reruns currently on weekdays mornings at 8am and 8:30am eastern. Since August 2017 Aspire currently airs reruns weekdays at 12:00pm and 2:00pm eastern.

References

External links
 

1998 American television series debuts
2002 American television series endings
1990s American black sitcoms
2000s American black sitcoms
1990s American sitcoms
2000s American sitcoms
American Broadcasting Company original programming
American television series revived after cancellation
English-language television shows
Television series about families
Television series by 20th Century Fox Television
Television shows set in Los Angeles
TGIF (TV programming block)
UPN original programming